Herbert Stanley Morris (1892 – 14 August 1919) was a botanist who served as District Commissioner on the island of Fiji and A.D.C. to the Governor of Fiji, Sir Ernest Bickham Sweet-Escott. He fought in World War I but was killed in a flying accident. 

Morris was born in Melbourne, Australia, but attended school in Bedford, Cape Colony. He studied botany at the University of Cape Town and won the 1908 medal for botany. He graduated with an Honours degree in botany in 1909. He subsequently became the District Commissioner for Fiji and A.D.C. to the Governor. He joined the Royal Flying Corps in World War I and rose to the rank of second lieutenant. He was killed in an aircraft accident in 1919 in England and left a wife, Sylvia Ena de Creft-Harford, and two daughters, Mary Morris and Ann Morris.

References

 UCT Libraries: Herbert Stanley Morris Botanical Notebooks
 Great War Forum
 Fiji Dead in World War I

1892 births
1919 deaths
Public servants from Melbourne
University of Cape Town alumni
Aviators killed in aviation accidents or incidents in England
Royal Flying Corps officers
Accidental deaths in England
British Army personnel of World War I
Emigrants from Australia to Cape Colony
Expatriates of South Africa in Fiji
People from the British Empire